Pteraster militaris, the wrinkled star, is a species of starfish in the family Pterasteridae. It is found in the northern Pacific Ocean, the Arctic Ocean, the Barents Sea and the northern Atlantic Ocean.

Description
Pteraster militaris is a robust starfish with a wide disc, a large central pore and five short, wrinkled, triangular arms. The aboral (upper) surface is dotted with papulae, each topped with four short spines and above this is a papery covering giving the starfish an inflated, bulky appearance.

Distribution

Biology
Pteraster militaris feeds on various species of sponge including the cloud sponge (Aphrocallistes vastus) and the white reticulated sponge (Iophon cheliferum) and also on hydrozoans such as the pink branching hydrocoral (Stylaster norvigicus) and the purple encrusting hydrocoral (Stylantheca).

Pteraster militaris is unusual among starfishes in that it broods some of its young. Eggs that are too numerous to be brooded are released direct into the sea where they become planktonic larvae. The brooded juveniles seem to behave as ectoparasites of the female, feeding on maternal tissues in the brood chamber. They may also eat dead embryos, faecal material and mucus.

References

Pterasteridae
Animals described in 1776
Taxa named by Otto Friedrich Müller